The 1954 Detroit Titans football team represented the University of Detroit in the Missouri Valley Conference (MVC) during the 1954 college football season. In their first season under head coach Wally Fromhart, the Titans compiled a 2–7 record (1–3 against conference opponents), finished fourth in the MVC, and were outscored by their opponents by a combined total of 158 to 107.

Schedule

References

External links
 1954 University of Detroit football programs

Detroit
Detroit Titans football seasons
Detroit Titans football
Detroit Titans football